The 2015 Abia State House of Assembly election was held on April 11, 2015, to elect members of the Abia State House of Assembly in Nigeria. All the 24 seats were up for election in the Abia State House of Assembly.

Upon the opening of the 6th State House of Assembly, Chikwendu Kalu (PDP-Isiala Ngwa South) was elected as Speaker of the House while Cosmos Ndukwe (PDP-Bende North) and Chinedum Enyinnaya Orji (PDP-Umuahia Central) became Deputy Speaker and House Leader, respectively.

Results

Osisioma South 
PDP candidate Emeka Alozie won the election.

Umuahia North 
APGA candidate Kelechi C. Onuzurike won the election.

Umuahia Central 
PDP candidate Chinedum Enyinnaya Orji won the election.

Isiala Ngwa North 
PDP candidate Martins O. Azubuike won the election.

Isiala Ngwa South 
PDP candidate Chikwendu Kalu won the election.

Isuikwuato 
APGA candidate Uloma Onuoha won the election.

Umuahia East 
PDP candidate Apugo Chukwudi J. won the election.

Umunneochi 
APGA candidate Ezekwesiri Ikedi Prince won the election.

Ukwa West 
PDP candidate Nwabuani Tonny Mezie won the election.

Ukwa East 
PDP candidate Taribo Paul won the election.

Obingwa East 
PDP candidate Solomon Akpulonu won the election.

Obingwa West 
PDP candidate Ahuru Ezenma C. T. Nkoro won the election.

Umuahia South 
APGA candidate Nwachukwu Chijioke E. won the election.

Ikwuano 
APGA candidate Ugboaja Theophilus O. won the election.

Ugwunagbo 
PDP candidate Munachim I. Alozie won the election.

Ohafia North 
PDP candidate Egwuonu Oghuru E. Obasi won the election.

Aba Central 
APGA candidate Abraham U. Oba won the election.

Osisioma North 
PDP candidate Kennedy Njoku won the election.

Aba North 
APGA candidate Emeka Nnamani won the election.

Arochukwu 
APGA candidate Luke Onyeani Ukara won the election.

Aba South 
APGA candidate Emmanuel Clinton Ebere won the election.

Bende North 
PDP candidate Cosmos N. Chukwudi won the election.

Bende South 
APGA candidate Okobuo Chibuzor Solomon won the election.

Ohafia South 
APGA candidate Uchendu Ifeanyi won the election.

References 

Abia State House of Assembly elections
2015 Nigerian House of Assembly elections